Philip Montfort may refer to:
 Philip of Montfort, Lord of Tyre ((died 17 March 1270)
 Philip of Montfort, Lord of Castres (died 24 September 1270)